Robert Parissi (born 29 December 1950 in Mingo Junction, Ohio) is an American singer, songwriter, and musician, best known as frontman for the American funk group Wild Cherry. He also wrote the group's only hit, the 1976 chart-topping "Play That Funky Music".. He was raised in the steel mill town of Mingo Junction, Ohio. He graduated from Mingo High School in 1968. Rob formed the band Wild Cherry in 1970 in Steubenville, Ohio, one mile north of Mingo Junction along the Ohio River. The band played the Ohio Valley region, Wheeling, West Virginia and the rest of the Northern West Virginia panhandle, and Pittsburgh, Pennsylvania.

After Wild Cherry disbanded in 1979 without another major hit, Parissi became a producer and dedicated himself to adult contemporary music. He writes and records smooth jazz and has collaborated with Steve Oliver and Will Donato.

Discography

With Wild Cherry 
 Wild Cherry, 1976
 Electrified Funk, 1977
 I Love My Music, 1978
 Only the Wild Survive, 1979

Solo 
 Late Bloomer, 2008
 Boca Ciega Bay, 2010
 Ocean Sunset, 2011
 East Coast Vibe, 2011
 The Real Deal, 2012

References

External links 
 - not Official site.

American funk singers
American funk guitarists
American male guitarists
Living people
1950 births
Wild Cherry (band) members
People from Mingo Junction, Ohio
Guitarists from Ohio
American people of Italian descent